The Dictionary of Sources of Classical Japan is a trilingual English, French, and Japanese dictionary of texts from pre-modern Japanese history and literature. Compiled under the auspices of the Historiographical Institute, the University of Tokyo (Shiryō hensan-jo), it consists of entries written and edited by some of the foremost scholars of pre-modern Japanese history and literature in the world today. This project is still a work in progress.

Layout
Entries in the Dictionary of Sources of Classical Japan include the name of the text in kanji, hiragana, and romaji; basic bibliographical information such as the authors(s) of the work and the date(s) that the work was written; a brief description of the text including full citations that correspond to publications of the Shiryô Hensanjo, as well as other secondary sources; and brief plot summaries and commentary, signed with the initials of author of the entry.

Access
The Dictionary of Sources of Classical Japan is available online at: https://archive.today/20070708182642/http://www.hi.u-tokyo.ac.jp/ships/index_w35.jsp

To access the dictionary, you must input the name of a text or a keyword in either kanji, hiragana, or romaji. A full-list of the texts currently available is at: https://web.archive.org/web/20051226110610/http://cliometa.hi.u-tokyo.ac.jp/ships_htdocs/entrylist.htm.

Editors

Joan R. Piggott, University of Southern California
Ineke Van Put, Catholic University of Leuven
Ivo Smits, Leiden University
Charlotte von Verschuer, École Pratique des Hautes Études
Michel Vieillard-Baron, Institut National des Langues et Civilisations Orientales (INALCO)

External links

Official Website: https://archive.today/20070708182642/http://www.hi.u-tokyo.ac.jp/ships/index_w35.jsp
A book version of the dictionary is available for purchase at: http://www.deboccard.com/ 

Japanese dictionaries